The East Side Airline Terminal was one of three air terminals in Midtown Manhattan. Opening in 1953, and occupying the full block west of 1st Avenue between 37th Street and 38th Street, the East Side Airline Terminal served as a location where passengers could purchase tickets and check baggage before boarding buses that would transport them to JFK Airport, LaGuardia Airport, or Newark Airport.

History
Contracts were signed for financing the new terminal on July 3, 1951 and construction began on July 25, 1951. The terminal, which cost $6,841,000 to construct, was built and owned by the Triborough Bridge and Tunnel Authority (TBTA) and leased to the East Side Airlines Terminal Corporation, a private entity composed of ten domestic airlines that used the facility.

The East Side Airline Terminal, with its immediate proximity to the Queens–Midtown Tunnel, replaced bus service from the 42nd Street Airlines Terminal, which was renamed the Airlines Building and became a ticketing-only facility until it was demolished in 1978. 

At the East Side Airline Terminal, passengers entered from the east or west sides of the building and took escalators or stairs to a rotunda on the second floor, which was a large hall lined with domestic airline ticket counters and bus gates. Buses would enter the western portion of the building from 38th Street, drive up a ramp to a U-shaped roadway around the second floor that contained 15 passenger loading platforms, and descend a ramp to exit the western portion of the building on 37th Street across from the entrance to the Queens–Midtown Tunnel. A mezzanine level above the rotunda included ticket counters for international air carriers and office space. The rooftop included 275 public parking spaces that were accessed by autos via a separate entrance and ramp. A bus garage and repair and servicing facilities were located in the basement.

Bus service from the East Side Airline Terminal to Newark Airport was discontinued when the West Side Airline Terminal opened in 1955. The location of the new terminal on the West Side near the Lincoln Tunnel eliminated the need for buses to travel crosstown on 42nd Street and shortened the travel time from 40 minutes to 21 minutes.

By the 1970s, most airlines had acquired baggage handling sites at the airports. The West Side terminal closed in 1972 and the East Side terminal was itself threatened with closure the following year when the airlines refused to renew their original 20-year lease. Closure of the East Side terminal was opposed by elected officials and civic groups, which led to negotiations by the city to prevent the terminal from closing. The TBTA agreed to keep the terminal open for three additional months while working out plans to continue operations; at that time the terminal was operating at an annual deficit of about $750,000. Bus fares were subsequently increased to enable the facility to break even.

In 1976, the terminal's rooftop parking was converted to a tennis facility operated by the Murray Hill Racquet Club. The club had ten Har-Tru courts in two pressurized air bubbles.

A report issued by New York City Comptroller Harrison J. Goldin in 1982 recommended that the city should negotiate new terms with the TBTA or the agency should relocate the terminal and sell the building because it was producing inadequate revenue. Eventually Carey moved its bus operations to the Port Authority Bus Terminal in 1984, leaving the East Side terminal operating primarily as rental space for various tenants, including the tennis club.

In 1985 the property was sold to developers for $90.6 million and became the eventual site of the 57-storey The Corinthian condominium. Most of the terminal itself was retained and incorporated into the base of the new development as office space.

References 

1953 establishments in New York City
Transport infrastructure completed in 1953
Murray Hill, Manhattan